David George Hume (27 May 1898 – 25 June 1964) was an  Australian rules footballer who played with South Melbourne in the Victorian Football League (VFL).

Notes

External links 

1898 births
1964 deaths
Australian rules footballers from Melbourne
Sydney Swans players
People from South Melbourne